Malakal Stadium is a multi-use stadium in Malakal, South Sudan.  It was built with the help of UN Peacekeeping Forces (INDBATT).

References

Athletics (track and field) venues in South Sudan
Football venues in South Sudan
Stadium